Bioska (Serbian Cyrillic: Биоска), is a village located in the Užice municipality of Serbia on the mountainous banks of Đetinja river and Lake Vrutci, between Zlatibor and Tara mountains, and close to Uzice-Ponikve airport and Kremna village, as well as Mokra Gora-Drvengrad, a.k.a. Küstendorf or Mećavnik (Мећавник),. According to the 2002 census, the village has a population of 554. The Monastery of Rujno was situated nearby.

Notable people
 Lenka Rabasović, heroine who fought as an irregular during World War I
 Milivoje Kostic, is a Serbian-American thermodynamicist and professor emeritus of mechanical engineering at Northern Illinois University, Licensed Professional Engineer (PE) in Illinois, and Editor-in-Chief of the Thermodynamics section of the journal Entropy.

References

External links

Užice
Populated places in Zlatibor District